Wyndham Estate was a leading winery in the Hunter Region, in New South Wales, Australia. It was founded by George Wyndham, who came to Australia in 1827 and planted a vineyard around his home, Dalwood, in the Hunter Valley. The winery won four gold medals, seven silver medals, and two bronze medals for its wines at the 1982 International Wine and Spirit Competition in England. The company was owned by Premium Wine Brands (previously Pernod Ricard Pacific).

It closed in 2014. In 2016 the property was purchase by Iris Capital, who reverted the winery to its original 1828 establishment name Dalwood Estate.

References

External links

Hunter Region
Pernod Ricard brands
Wineries in New South Wales
Australian companies established in 1827
Food and drink companies established in 1827